Wulkuraka railway station is located on the Main line in Queensland, Australia. It serves the Ipswich suburb of Wulkuraka.

History
Wulkuraka station opened as Brisbane Valley Junction in the 1880s, being the junction station for the Brisbane Valley railway line from 1884 until 1989. It was renamed Wulkuraka in 1905. The station has undergone an extensive refurbishment in conjunction with the construction of the New Generation Rollingstock depot, west of the station.

Sadliers Crossing Railway Bridge
The Sadliers Crossing Railway Bridge is a heritage-listed truss bridge built in 1902 to the east of Wulkuraka station across the Bremer River.

Depot
A maintenance depot for the New Generation Rollingstock trains lies west of the station.

Services
Wulkuraka is served by City network services from Rosewood to Ipswich. Most services terminate at Ipswich although some peak-hour services continue to Bowen Hills and Caboolture.

Services by platform

References

External links

Wulkuraka station Queensland Rail
Wulkuraka station Queensland's Railways on the Internet
[ Wulkuraka station] TransLink travel information

Wulkuraka, Queensland
Railway stations in Ipswich City
Main Line railway, Queensland